

First round selections

The following are the first round picks in the 1982 Major League Baseball Draft.

Compensation Picks

Other notable players 
David Wells†, 2nd round, 30th overall by the Toronto Blue Jays
Allan Anderson, 2nd round, 32nd overall by the Minnesota Twins
Barry Bonds†, 2nd round, 39th overall by the San Francisco Giants, but did not sign
Lance McCullers, 2nd round, 41st overall by the Philadelphia Phillies
Bo Jackson, 2nd round, 50th overall by the New York Yankees, but did not sign
Barry Larkin‡, 2nd round, 51st overall by the Cincinnati Reds, but did not sign
Steve Ontiveros†, 2nd round, 54th overall by the Oakland Athletics
Jimmy Key†, 3rd round, 56th overall by the Toronto Blue Jays
Roger McDowell, 3rd round, 59th overall by the New York Mets
Zane Smith, 3rd round, 63rd overall by the Atlanta Braves
Kenny Williams, 3rd round, 68th overall by the Chicago White Sox
Mike Greenwell†, 3rd round, 72nd overall by the Boston Red Sox
Dan Pasqua, 3rd round, 76th overall by the New York Yankees
Kirk McCaskill, 4th round, 88th overall by the California Angels
Randy Johnson‡, 4th round, 89th overall by the Atlanta Braves, but did not sign
Will Clark†, 4th round, 90th overall by the Kansas City Royals, but did not sign
Mike Maddux, 5th round, 119th overall by the Philadelphia Phillies
Steve Buechele, 5th round, 122nd overall by the Texas Rangers
B.J. Surhoff†, 5th round, 128th overall by the New York Yankees, but did not sign
Charlie O'Brien, 5th round, 132nd overall by the Oakland Athletics
Pat Borders, 6th round, 134th overall by the Toronto Blue Jays
Alvin Davis†, 6th round, 138th overall by the Seattle Mariners
Terry Pendleton†, 7th round, 179th overall by the St. Louis Cardinals
Bobby Witt, 7th round, 181st overall by the Cincinnati Reds, but did not sign
Mitch Williams†, 8th round, 187th overall by the San Diego Padres
Rafael Palmeiro†, 8th round, 189th overall by the New York Mets, but did not sign
Mark McLemore, 9th round, 218th overall by the California Angels
Tom Browning†, 9th round, 233rd overall by the Cincinnati Reds
Pete Incaviglia, 10th round, 247th overall by the San Francisco Giants, but did not sign
Vince Coleman†, 10th round, 257th overall by the St. Louis Cardinals
Walt Weiss†, 10th round, 260th overall by the Baltimore Orioles, but did not sign
Rob Dibble†, 11th round, 283rd overall by the St. Louis Cardinals, but did not sign
Billy Ripken, 11th round, 286th overall by the Baltimore Orioles
Jose Canseco†, 15th round, 392nd overall by the Oakland Athletics
Fredi González, 16th round, 414th overall by the New York Yankees
Chuck Crim, 17th round, 443rd overall by the Milwaukee Brewers
Jim Morris, 18th round, 466th overall by the New York Yankees, but did not sign
Bret Saberhagen†, 19th round, 480th overall by the Kansas City Royals
Bob Patterson, 21st round, 524th overall by the San Diego Padres
Jim Deshaies, 21st round, 542nd overall by the New York Yankees
Mike Rizzo, 22nd round, 554th overall by the California Angels
Jim Corsi, 25th round, 642nd overall by the New York Yankees
Mike Henneman†, 27th round, 672nd overall by the Toronto Blue Jays, but did not sign
Lance Johnson†, 31st round, 760th overall by the Seattle Mariners, but did not sign
Bruce Ruffin, 31st round, 766th overall by the Philadelphia Phillies, but did not sign
Kenny Rogers†, 39th round, 816th overall by the Texas Rangers
Dave Martinez, 40th round, 819th overall by the Texas Rangers, but did not sign

† All-Star  
‡ Hall of Famer

NBA/NCAA/NFL players drafted
Urban Meyer, 13th round, 323rd overall by the Atlanta Braves
Dell Curry, 37th round, 810th overall by the Texas Rangers, but did not sign
Rodney Carter, 38th round, 813th overall by the Texas Rangers, but did not sign

References

External links 
Complete draft list from The Baseball Cube database

Major League Baseball draft
Draft
Major League Baseball draft